William Joseph Gabriel Doyle, SJ MC (3 March 1873 – 16 August 1917), better known as Willie Doyle, was an Irish Catholic priest who was killed in action while serving as a military chaplain to the Royal Dublin Fusiliers during the First World War. He is a candidate for sainthood in the Catholic Church.

Early life
Doyle was born in Dalkey, Ireland, the youngest of seven children of Hugh and Christine Doyle (née Byrne). He was educated at Ratcliffe College, Leicester. After reading St. Alphonsus' book Instructions and Consideration on the Religious State he was inspired to enter the priesthood. In 1891 he entered St Stanislaus Tullabeg College, and was ordained a Jesuit priest in 1907. From 1909 until 1915 he served on the Jesuit mission team, travelling around Ireland and Britain preaching parish missions and conducting retreats. In 1914 he was involved in the foundation of a Colettine Poor Clares monastery in Cork. He was an early member of the Pioneer Total Abstinence Association and had been considered a future leader of the organization by its founder, Fr James Cullen.

First World War
Doyle served in the Royal Army Chaplains' Department of the British Army during the First World War, appointed as a chaplain to the 48th Brigade of the 16th Irish Division. During the Battle of Loos Doyle was caught in a German gas attack and for his conduct was mentioned in dispatches. A recommendation for a Military Cross was rejected as "he had not been long enough at the front". Doyle was presented with the "parchment of merit" of the 49th (Irish) Brigade instead. He was killed in the Battle of Langemarck, on 16 August 1917.

Legacy
General William Hickie, the commander-in-chief of the 16th (Irish) Division, described Father Doyle as "one of the bravest men who fought or served out here."

Father Doyle's body was never recovered but he is commemorated at Tyne Cot Memorial.

Father Doyle was proposed for canonisation in 1938, but this was not followed through. His papers can be found in the Jesuit archives, Leeson Street, Dublin.

A stained glass window dedicated to his memory is present in St Finnian's Church, Dromin, County Louth, Ireland.

Despite his troubled relationship with the Roman Catholic Church in Ireland, Irish author and playwright Brendan Behan is known to have always felt a great admiration for Father William Doyle. He praised Father Doyle in his 1958 memoir Borstal Boy. Also, Alfred O'Rahilly's biography of the fallen chaplain is known to have been one of Behan's favorite books.

Irish folk singer Willie 'Liam' Clancy was named after him due to his mother's fondness for Doyle, although they never met.

Decorations
Doyle was awarded the Military Cross for his bravery during the assault on the village of Ginchy during the Battle of the Somme in 1916. He was also posthumously recommended for both the Victoria Cross and the Distinguished Service Order, but was awarded neither. According to Patrick Kenny, anti-Catholicism may have played a role in the British Army's decision not to grant Father Doyle both awards.

Published pamphlets
Retreats for working men: why not in Ireland? (1909)
Vocations (1913)
Shall I be a priest? (1915)

Cause for Canonisation
In August 2022, the Father Willie Doyle Association was established to petition the Catholic Church to introduce a cause for canonisation for Doyle. In January 2022 the Supplex Libellus, the formal petition, was presented to Bishop Thomas Deenihan. Having consulted with the Irish Bishops' Conference and the Dicastery for the Causes of Saints, Deenihan issued an edict on 27 October announcing the opening of a cause. The Opening Session took place on 20 November 2022 at the Cathedral of Christ the King, Mullingar.

References

Further reading
Johnstone, Tom and Hagerty, James, The cross on the sword: catholic chaplains in the forces (1996)
Kenny, Patrick (2017), To Raise the Fallen: A Selection of the War Letters, Prayers, and Spiritual Writings of Fr. Willie Doyle, S.J., Ignatius Press.
McRedmond Louis, To the greater glory: a history of the Irish Jesuits (1991)
O'Rahilly, Alfred, Fr William Doyle, S.J.: a spiritual study (1920)
Smyth, John (Sir), In this sign conquer (1968)
Stuart, Henry L., "Fr William Doyle S.J.", The Commonweal, no. 8 (11 November 1925), 11–14
Canonisation website: williedoyle.org

20th-century Irish Jesuits
British Army personnel of World War I
Royal Army Chaplains' Department officers
Recipients of the Military Cross
World War I chaplains
Irish military chaplains
British military personnel killed in World War I
People from Dalkey
Irish people of World War I
1873 births
1917 deaths
Royal Ulster Rifles officers